Roberto Mascaró (born 12 December 1946 in Montevideo) is a Uruguayan poet and translator.

Resident in Sweden, he is renowned for his Spanish translations of Tomas Tranströmer's work.

Poetry
Estacionario (poems), Nordan, Stockholm, 1983.
Chatarra/Campos (poems), Siesta, Stockholm, 1984.
Asombros de la nieve (poems), Siesta, Stockholm, 1984.
Fält (Campos) (poems with Swedish version by Hans Bergqvist), Fripress, Stockholm, 1986.
Mar, escobas (poems), Ediciones de Uno, Montevideo, 1987.
Södra Korset/ Cruz del Sur (bilingual poetry), Siesta, Stockholm, 1987.
Gueto (poems), Vintén Editor, Montevideo, 1991.
Öppet fält / Campo abierto, Siesta, Malmö, 1998.
Campo de fuego, Aymara, Montevideo, 2000 (Premio Internacional de Poesía Ciudad de Medellín 2002)
Montevideo cruel, Ediciones Imaginarias, Montevideo, 2003.
Un río de pájaros, Fondo Editorial EAFIT, Medellín, Colombia, 2004.
Asombros de la nieve (anthology), La Liebre Libre, Venezuela, 2004.

Translations 
La nueva poesía sueca (with Mario Romero), Siesta, Stockholm, 1985.
Postales negras (poems by Tomas Tranströmer), Inferno, Buenos Aires, 1988.
El bosque en otoño (poems by T. Tranströmer), Ediciones de Uno, Montevideo, 1989.
Poemas sin terminar (poems by Göran Sonnevi), Vintén Editor, Montevideo, 1991.
En los abedules está la luz (poems by Jan Erik Vold), Vintén Editor, Montevideo, 1991.
Para vivos y muertos (selected poems by T. Tranströmer), Hiperión, Madrid, 1992.
Caminar sobre las aguas, Anthony de Mello, Lumén, Madrid, 1993.
Öjvind Fahlström: versiones de manifiestos y poemas concretos, Instituto Valenciano de Arte Moderno, Centro Julio González, Valencia, 1992.
August Strindberg, IVAM, Centro Julio González, Valencia, 1993.
Graffiti (poems by Hans Bergqvist), Zafiria libros, Montevideo, 1993. 
Viaje nocturno (poems by T. Tranströmer)
Casa con creatura (poems by Ulf Eriksson)
Góndola fúnebre (poems by Tomas Tranströmer), LAR, Concepción, Chile, 2000
29 jaicus y otros poemas/ 29 haiku och andra dikter (poems by T. Tranströmer), Encuentros imaginarios, Montevideo, 2004.
Elvis, arena para el gato y otras cosas importantes (poems by Tomas Ekström), Encuentros imaginarios, Montevideo, 2004.
Solo (novela), August Strindberg, Jakembo Editores, Asunción, Paraguay, 2006.

References

External links
 Artículos de Mascaró
 Mascaró en «Jornal de Poesía»

1946 births
Uruguayan people of Catalan descent
Writers from Montevideo
20th-century Uruguayan poets
Uruguayan male poets
Uruguayan translators
Uruguayan expatriates in Sweden
Swedish–Spanish translators
Living people
21st-century Uruguayan poets
21st-century Uruguayan male writers
20th-century Uruguayan male writers